Luhansk or Lugansk is a city in Ukraine.

Luhansk or Lugansk may also refer to:

Places
 Luhansk Raion, a district of Ukraine in the eponymous province with the eponymous city as its capital, unrecognized by the eponymous country, declared by the Ukrainian government in Kyiv in 2020
 Luhansk Oblast, a province of Ukraine with the eponymous city as its capital
 Luhansk People's Republic (LPR or LNR), a separatist country since 2014, only recognized by Russia since 2022, claiming the whole of the eponymous province in Ukraine, whose capital is the eponymous city, controlling 1/3 of the province prior to 2022

Facilities and structures
 Luhansk International Airport, Luhansk, Luhansk Oblast, Ukraine
 Luhansk railway station, Luhansk, Luhansk Oblast, Ukraine
 University of Luhansk, Luhansk, Luhansk Oblast, Ukraine; also known as Lugansk National University (LNU)
 Luhansk Cathedral Mosque, Luhansk, Luhansk Oblast, Ukraine
 Luhansk power station, Shchastia, Luhansk Oblast, Ukraine
 Luhansk Border Base, Luhansk, Luhansk Oblast, Ukraine; besieged by separatists in 2014 during the Siege of the Luhansk Border Base

Other uses
 Luhansk Regional Committee of the Communist Party of Ukraine, Luhansk Oblast, Ukraine, USSR
 Luhansk People's Republic national football team, a soccer team
 Lugansk Airlines, a defunct Ukrainian airline based in Luhansk

See also
 Luhansk State Medical University, Luhansk, Luhansk Oblast, Ukraine
 Luhansk State University of Internal Affairs, Luhansk, Luhansk Oblast, Ukraine
 Lugansk Higher Military Aviation School of Navigators, Luhansk, Luhansk Oblast, Ukraine